Labeo nigripinnis is a species of fish in the genus Labeo. It inhabits freshwater rivers in subtropical locations of Pakistan.1

References 

Labeo
Fish described in 1877